Peru participated in the World Cup during the first World Cup in 1930 and his qualifiers since 1958.

Peru were invited to the first FIFA World Cup in Uruguay in 1930. They lost both of their games and finished 10th out of 13 teams. The team either withdrew or did not enter the next four tournaments, in 1934, 1938, 1950, and 1954. Peru participated but did not qualify in 1958, 1962, or 1966.

Peru had its best result in Mexico 1970, finishing in seventh place. Peru again finished in the top eight at the World Cup in Argentina 1978. They finished first in their group during the first round of the tournament, but were eliminated after losing all their games in the second round. Peru reached the next World Cup finals in Spain 1982, although the team was eliminated in the first round after 2 draws and 1 loss. From 1986 to 2014, Peru did not advance past the CONMEBOL qualifying round.

After finishing fifth in CONMEBOL qualifying, Peru reached the 2018 finals by defeating New Zealand in an intercontinental play-off. Peru did not make it past the group stage in 2018, winning one match and losing two.

Peru finished fifth again in 2022 qualification and returned to the intercontinental play-off, this time as a one-off match against Australia. However, Peru would lose the match on penalties, 5–4, thus failing to qualify for Group D of the 2022 FIFA World Cup.

History

Finals 
As one of the 13 national sides that accepted the invitation to the inaugural World Cup, Peru was placed in Group 3 with Romania and hosts Uruguay. With a mere 300 spectators, Peru's match against Romania holds the record of lowest attendance in a World Cup game. Peru lost (1–3) in a violent game where, in the second half, a fight broke out and a Peruvian became the first player sent off in a World Cup. A few days later, Peru and Uruguay played the inaugural match in the Estadio Centenario in Montevideo. The Peruvians were lauded by the spectators for their defense and the impressive ability of forward José María Lavalle. Peru lost (0-1) to the eventual champions, who defeated their subsequent opponents by scoring at least 4 goals per game.

The Peruvian squad next qualified for the Mexico 1970 World Cup, where they were placed in Group 4 with West Germany, Bulgaria, and Morocco. Playing their first game two days after the 1970 Ancash earthquake, the team quickly conceded two goals to Bulgaria. However, as Brian Glanville stated, "the elusive dribbling of Cubillas, the powerful breaks from the back four of Héctor Chumpitaz, the running of [Hugo] Sotil and [Alberto] Gallardo, turned the tide." Peru eventually won 3–2. After defeating Morocco (3–0) and losing to West Germany (1–3), the team finished second in the group and advanced to the quarterfinals. Facing Rivellino, Tostão, Jairzinho and Pelé, Peru was beaten by Brazil (2–4) in "a spectacular and effervescent game, a game in which both sides delighted in attack and scorned caution," and where both teams displayed "a feast of open play and goals."

In the Argentina 1978 World Cup, Peru was placed in Group 4 with Scotland, Iran, and the Netherlands. With a midfield identified "as the best in the world" by Argentine sports magazine El Gráfico, Peru advanced to the second round as group leaders after defeating Scotland (3–1), drawing with the Netherlands (0–0), and beating Iran (4–1). The second round was divided into two groups, and Peru's results placed it in Group B with Poland, Brazil, and Argentina. After losing to Brazil (0–3) and Poland (0–1), Peru was practically out of contention despite having one more game to play against Argentina. This last match proved controversial because the Peruvians lost by a margin (0–6) that allowed Argentina to reach the final instead of Brazil. Rumors circulated that the match had been fixed, but nothing was ever proven.

Peru participated in the Spain 1982 World Cup as part of Group 1 with Italy, Poland, and Cameroon. Prior to the competition, Peru embarked on a practice tour that included victories against Hungary (1–2) in Budapest and France (0–1) in Paris, a tie with Algeria (1–1) in Algiers, and, upon returning home, a victory over Romania (2–0). In the World Cup finals, Peru's opening match against Cameroon ended in a scoreless draw. Against Italy, Peru "put on a mix of solid defending and spectacular attacking" that resulted in a draw (1–1) against the eventual champions. Peru only needed another draw to advance in the tournament, and it managed to maintain a scoreless first half against Poland, but a "mixup in the midfield" and a "tired defense" during the second half led to Peru's defeat (1–5) and early elimination.

Peru would next participate at a World Cup in Russia in 2018, 32 years after their last appearance. On 16 June 2018 they lost 0–1 against Denmark, with a goal scored by Yussuf Poulsen; on 21 June they lost 0–1 against France, with a goal scored by Kylian Mbappé; and on 26 June they defeated Australia 2–0, with goals scored by André Carrillo and Paolo Guerrero. It was the first time Peru had played these three nations at a World Cup, but they were eliminated in the group stage after finishing third with three points.

Qualifiers 
Teams were invited to participate at the 1930 World Cup, so there was no qualifying tournaments. Peru did not enter or withdrew from the qualifying rounds in 1934, 1938, 1950 and 1954. Peru failed to qualify in 1958, 1962 and 1966.

For the 1970 CONMEBOL qualifying tournament, Peru eliminated Bolivia and Argentina. The game between Peru and Bolivia in La Paz is infamous for being fixed by Argentina in favor of Bolivia. Match referee Sergio Chechelev annulled a valid goal from Peru without any justification, allowing Bolivia to win 2–1. Years later, Chechelev admitted that Argentina had paid him to favor Bolivia. Against Argentina in Buenos Aires, the last game of the group, Peru managed a 2–2 draw, preventing Argentina's intervention from succeeding in the end. This is the only time Argentina has failed to advance in World Cup qualifying.

Peru was eliminated by Chile in 1974. In 1978 and 1982, Peru finished at the top of their group and advanced to the finals. Peru had two wins and two draws in both three-team groups, eliminating Chile and Ecuador in 1978 and Uruguay and Columbia in 1982.

Peru almost qualified for Mexico 1986. Peru was placed in Group 1 with Argentina, Colombia and Venezuela. Peru's last two matches were against Argentina. Peru beat Argentina 1–0 in Lima on 23 June 1985. In a rematch seven days later in Buenos Aires, Peru led 2–1 but Ricardo Gareca inspired his team to a 2–2 draw sending Argentina into the World Cup finals which they would win. A win would have put Peru directly into the finals, however, they still had a chance to qualify through the CONMEBOL playoff. Peru lost 2–5 aggregate to Chile in the first round.

Peru was grouped for the 1990 World Cup qualification along with Bolivia and Uruguay. Peru lost all their games with only two goals scored, one by José del Solar and the other by Andres Gonzales. Julio César Uribe was considered one of the best players of the team at that time.

The campaign to reach France 1998 was settled only on goal difference, as they finished even on points with Chile. The qualifying system had changed and now all teams were to face each other, and Peru had been able to maintain the 4th spot until the next-to-last match when they faced Chile at Santiago. Peru lost 4–0.

The preliminaries for Korea/Japan 2002 were difficult, as the team finished eighth in the group with just four wins in eighteen matches. The fact that they only managed to score 14 goals demonstrated how far the attack had fallen since the days of Cubillas. Particularly low points of the qualifying tournament included a 3–0 loss at Venezuela and defeats in over half of their home matches to Uruguay, Ecuador, Argentina, Colombia and Brazil.

During the years of 2004 and 2005, Peru participated in the qualifier for the Germany 2006 World Cup. Peru this time hit the ground hard as conflicts with the team's management soon showed poor results in the games that were to follow. Paulo Autuori managed the squad, but was not able to achieve popularity due to a disastrous campaign that led Peru into 8th place just above Bolivia and Venezuela. Freddy Ternero also momentarily managed the squad, but was dismissed due to problems with the FPF.

The South Africa 2010 qualifiers, beginning in 2007, resulted in another set of problems for the Peruvian team. In their first four games, the team only achieved two ties, both at home, and two losses. Controversies between the FPF and the IPD (Peruvian Sports Institute) caused problems outside of the field for the national team. Also a scandal shook the team as it was discovered, with informational support of prominent figures such as Jaime Bayly, that several of the players had been partying during the time they were supposedly "concentrating" for a match against Brazil. Since then, Claudio Pizarro (SV Werder Bremen), Jefferson Farfán (Schalke 04), Andrés Mendoza (Diyarbakırspor) and Santiago Acasiete (UD Almería), important figures in the team, were never considered again for the national team by coach José del Solar. The 2008 calendar year resulted with three losses, including a 6–0 defeat against Uruguay, two draws against Argentina and Colombia, and only one game won against Venezuela. In 2009 la blanquirroj couldn't revert the situation, being the first team eliminated, at the 14th round. They only won two matches during this year, against Uruguay and Bolivia.

Finally, after 36 years, the national team managed to make it to the 2018 World Cup in Russia. They finished fifth in the qualifiers, following a controversial final day draw against Colombia. They went on to face New Zealand in an inter-continental play-off, winning 2–0 on aggregate, courtesy of goals from Farfán and Christian Ramos, to become the last team to qualify for Russia.

By Opponent

Match records

Finals

By Match

Qualifiers

Record players

Top goalscorers

See also 

Peru at the CONCACAF Gold Cup
Peru at the Copa América
Peru at the Olympics
Peru at the Pan American Games
Peru at the Paralympics
Peruvian Primera División
Sport in Peru

Notes

References

Bibliography 

 
 
 
 
 
 
 
 
 
 

 
Countries at the FIFA World Cup